Alex Martínez (born 9 March 1939) is a Salvadoran weightlifter. He competed in the men's bantamweight event at the 1968 Summer Olympics.

References

1939 births
Living people
Salvadoran male weightlifters
Olympic weightlifters of El Salvador
Weightlifters at the 1968 Summer Olympics
People from La Paz Department (El Salvador)